Allswell is a 2022 American comedy-drama film directed by Ben Snyder, starring Liza Colón-Zayas, Elizabeth Rodriguez and Daphne Rubin-Vega.

Cast
 Liza Colón-Zayas as Daisy
 Elizabeth Rodriguez as Ida
 Daphne Rubin-Vega as Serene
 Mackenzie Lansing as Nina
 Michael Rispoli as Ray
 J. Cameron Barnett as Clint
 Shyrley Rodriguez as Constance
 Felix Solis as Desmond
 Bobby Cannavale as Gabe
 Max Casella as Tim

Release
The film premiered at the Tribeca Film Festival on 13 June 2022.

Reception
William Bibbiani of TheWrap wrote that the film is "full of love and meaning while engaging, directly, with the failings of the film’s characters." Mae Abdulbaki of ScreenRant wrote that while the film "could have certainly expanded on the character dynamics a bit more", it is "engaging and well-handled overall".

Sumner Forbes of Film Threat gave the film a score of 6 out of 10. Kristen Lopez of IndieWire gave the film a grade of "C" and wrote that the film "feels like a Lifetime series pilot, with the women adhering to one stereotype each", and that "These aren’t characters reconciling with their past; it’s three disparate characters forced to be in one movie."

References

External links
 
 

American comedy-drama films
2022 comedy-drama films